Soni Singh  is an Indian television actress. She has appeared in comedy show Comedy Nights with Kapil. She was one of the contestants on in the reality show Bigg Boss 8 but got eliminated after 5 weeks. She also played one of the main leads in Ghar ki Lakshmi Betiyann.

Career
Soni has been in several TV shows including her notable work like Banoo Main Teri Dulhann, Ghar Ki Lakshmi Betiyann, Teen Bahuraniyaan, Jhansi Ki Rani and Mann Kee Awaaz Pratigya. She was a contestant on Bigg Boss 8.

Soni Singh played the role of Menaka Shakti Singh in Mann Kee Awaaz Pratigya.

Soni Singh is also known for playing the fictional Indian Superheroine 'Shakira' in Shakira The End of Evil TV series telecasted on youth television channel Bindass in 2007. The Action Packed show received a lukewarm response in India but was a hit on American website Netflix

In September 2014, Singh entered the reality controversial TV show Bigg Boss in its eighth season. Soni had spent 2 weeks in the plane crash area and then went in the house. She spent 5 weeks in the house and was evicted on Day 35. During the show she along with Upen was accused for sharing the same bed together.

Television

References

External links

Living people
Actresses from Patna
Indian television actresses
Indian soap opera actresses
Bigg Boss (Hindi TV series) contestants
Actors from Mumbai
Year of birth missing (living people)